Thomas J. Murphy, Jr. (born August 15, 1944), mayor of Pittsburgh, Pennsylvania
John W. Murphy (Connecticut politician), mayor of New Haven, Connecticut
Brian Murphy (politician), mayor of Moncton, Canada
Frank Murphy (1890–1949), mayor of Detroit, Michigan
Dick Murphy (born December 16, 1942), mayor of San Diego, California
Percy Marunui Murphy, mayor in New Zealand